Rosedale is a community within the Town of Drumheller, Alberta, Canada. It was previously a hamlet within the former Municipal District (MD) of Badlands No. 7 prior to the MD's amalgamation with the former City of Drumheller on January 1, 1998. It is also recognized as a designated place by Statistics Canada.

It lies at the confluence of the Red Deer River and the Rosebud River. The community is within Census Division No. 5 and in the federal riding of Crowfoot.

Demographics 

As a designated place in the 2011 Census, Rosedale had a population of 335 living in 140 of its 152 total dwellings, a 4.7% change from its 2006 population of 320.

Attractions 

Rosedale was home to a variety of coal mines before their closure in the 1970s. The  Star Mine Suspension Bridge built in 1931 over the Red Deer River used to connect the settlement with coal mines established on the opposite side of the river. It was rebuilt in 1958, and now serves as a tourist attraction that is indefinitely closed. A miner memorial is also located in Rosedale near the town hall.

See also 
List of communities in Alberta

References 

Former designated places in Alberta
Drumheller
Populated places disestablished in 1998
Former hamlets in Alberta